Vecsés is a district in central part of Pest County. Vecsés is also the name of the town where the district seat is found. The district is located in the Central Hungary Statistical Region.

Geography 
Vecsés District borders with Gödöllő District to the north, Nagykáta District to the northeast, Monor District to the southeast, Gyál District to the southwest, Budapest to the northwest. The number of the inhabited places in Vecsés District is 4.

Municipalities 
The district has 3 towns and 1 large village.
(ordered by population, as of 1 January 2013)

The bolded municipalities are cities, italics municipality is large village.

Demographics

In 2011, it had a population of 47,026 and the population density was 393/km².

Ethnicity
Besides the Hungarian majority, the main minorities are the German (approx. 1,300), Roma (450), Slovak (350) and Romanian (300).

Total population (2011 census): 47,026
Ethnic groups (2011 census): Identified themselves: 43,405 persons:
Hungarians: 40,264 (92.76%)
Germans: 1,338 (3.08%)
Gypsies: 469 (1.08%)
Others and indefinable: 1,334 (3.07%)
Approx. 3,500 persons in Vecsés District did not declare their ethnic group at the 2011 census.

Religion
Religious adherence in the county according to 2011 census:

Catholic – 15,439 (Roman Catholic – 15,037; Greek Catholic – 395);
Reformed – 5,349;
Evangelical – 1,397;
other religions – 945; 
Non-religious – 8,202; 
Atheism – 663;
Undeclared – 15,031.

Gallery

See also
List of cities and towns in Hungary

References

External links
 Postal codes of the Vecsés District

Districts in Pest County